Abahai may refer to:
 Western literature's mistaken name for Hong Taiji, Qing Emperor, 20 October 1626 – 15 May 1636
 Lady Abahai Manchu Grand Consort, and posthumously Empress 1590–1626